The Spirit of West Point is a 1947 American drama film directed by Ralph Murphy and written by Tom Reed. The film stars Doc Blanchard, Glenn Davis, Robert Shayne, Anne Nagel, Alan Hale Jr., George O'Hanlon, Michael Browne and Tanis Chandler. The film was released on October 4, 1947, by Film Classics.

Plot
The story of Doc Blancard and Glenn Davis, who were both at West Point at the same time and both won the Heisman Trophy.

Cast      
Doc Blanchard as himself
Glenn Davis as himself
Robert Shayne as Col. Earl 'Red' Blaik
Anne Nagel as Mrs. Blaik
Alan Hale Jr. as Oklahoma Cutter
George O'Hanlon as Joe Wilson
Michael Browne as Roger 'Mileaway' McCarty
Tanis Chandler as Mildred
Mary Newton as Mrs. Mary Blanchard
William Forrest as Dr. Felix Blanchard
Lee Bennett as Cadet Cabot
Mickey McCardle as Quarterback
John Gallaudet as Bert Ferriss
Rudy Wissler as Young Doc Blanchard
Tom Harmon as Radio Sportscaster
Bill Stern as Radio Sportscaster
Harry Wismer as Radio Sportscaster
Margaret Wells as Mrs. Davis
Franklin Parker as Ralph Davis Sr.

References

External links
 

1947 films
American drama films
1947 drama films
Film Classics films
Films directed by Ralph Murphy
American black-and-white films
1940s English-language films
1940s American films